GNUnited Nations is a free program developed by the GNU Project to manage translation of HTML files. It produces a template from a master HTML file, which can be filled in with translations. The program then generates the translated pages, including the markup from the first page unchanged.

External links
GNUN's official site

References

GNUnited Nations
Translation software

fr:Projet_GNU#GNUnited_Nations